Anders Peak is a peak  high, rising  south of the Gruvletindane Crags of the Holtedahl Peaks, in the Orvin Mountains of Queen Maud Land. It was mapped by Norwegian cartographers from air photos and surveys by the Sixth Norwegian Antarctic Expedition, 1956–60, and named for Anders Vinten-Johansen, a medical officer with the expedition, 1957–58.

References 

Mountains of Queen Maud Land
Princess Astrid Coast